Sandiacre is a town and civil parish in the borough of Erewash in Derbyshire, in the East Midlands region of England adjoining the border with Nottinghamshire. The population of the town was 8,889 at the 2011 Census.

The name Sandiacre is usually thought to refer to a sandy acre, though another interpretation, based on Saint Diacre, is sometimes advanced.

Geography
Seven miles west of Nottingham and nine miles east of Derby, Sandiacre is part of the Greater Nottingham urban area. It is on the western side of the River Erewash from Stapleford in Nottinghamshire. Sandiacre is adjoined by Long Eaton to the south and Risley to the west. Junction 25 of the M1 motorway lies in Sandiacre, where it crosses the A52 Brian Clough Way.

Background
The Erewash Canal passes through the centre of Sandiacre, and the small basin immediately above Sandiacre Lock (No. 11 on the canal) was once the terminal link of the now-defunct Derby Canal. Situated next to the canal in the town centre is the Springfield Mill, built in 1888 as a lace mill and a reminder of Sandiacre's industrial heritage, now converted into a modern apartment complex. The building suffered a large fire in April 2020 which caused extensive damage.
Examples of lace making and furniture making can still be found today. The discovery of local ironstone led to the development of Stanton Ironworks in 1787. DB Cargo UK's Toton depot, which lies on the edge of Sandiacre, was a main employer in the town a number of years ago.

Although there is currently no railway station, the town was once home to a terminal on the Midland Railway, and passenger trains travelling on the London St Pancras - Manchester Piccadilly line still passed along the border with Stapleford during 2003–2004. Transport links to Nottingham, Derby and the surrounding area are currently provided by Trentbarton.

The parish church is Saint Giles' Church, which dates back to the 10th century. There is also a Methodist church in the town.
The old village lock-up still exists, situated near to St. Giles.

The 1801 census recorded Sandiacre's population as 405. By 1901, this had risen to 2,954, with the 1971 census reporting a population of 7,792. The current population is now hovering at an estimated 9,000.

Schools
The schools in Sandiacre are Ladycross Infants School, Cloudside Academy junior school and Friesland School – a secondary school with sixth form.

Sport

Football 
Sandiacre Town F.C. (established in 1978) play at St. Giles' Park. The first team compete in the Nottinghamshire Senior League Premier Division.

Cricket 
Sandiacre Town Cricket Club (established in 1877) play at the ground on Longmoor Lane. Sandiacre Town CC compete in the Derbyshire County Cricket League; the top level for recreational club cricket in Derbyshire, England, and is a designated ECB Premier League. Since the League was founded in 1999, Sandiacre have won 6 Championship league titles: 2002, 2004, 2012, 2015, 2017 and 2021. They have also been the winners of the ECB National Club Cricket Championship in 2003 and 2014.

Notable people
Sir John de Benstede was Prebendary of Sandiacre from 3 February 1297 until, presumably, 1308, when he married.
John Barret, the Presbyterian minister, moved to Sandiacre in 1665 after losing the living of St Peter's Church, Nottingham in the Great Ejection.
Enoch Cook, the Derbyshire county cricketer, was born in Sandiacre in 1845.
Sławomir Rawicz, who claimed to be a Gulag escapee, was a resident of Sandiacre until his death in 2004, and is buried in the local cemetery.
Charlie Thomson, Clyde, Chelsea and Nottingham Forest goalkeeper (1949–61), retired to Sandiacre.

See also 
 Crossley-Premier, manufacturer of heavy oil engines
 Listed buildings in Sandiacre

References

External links
Sandiacre History & Heritage site
A tour of Sandiacre's heritage
Sandiacre Community Hub

Towns in Derbyshire
Civil parishes in Derbyshire
Borough of Erewash